Bit-Amukani (in the Aramaic Assur Ostracon ʾwkn; Assyrian mA-muk-ka-nu; Babylonian diBit U-ka-a-ni, diU-ka-nu; lit. House of Amukani) was a tribe, proto-state founded by Chaldeans in southern Mesopotamia which stretched from southeast of Nippur to the area of Uruk. It is considered as one of the most powerful Chaldean tribes, next to Bīt-Iakin and Bīt-Dakkūri.

As early as 732. B.C.E. it was ruled by prince Ukinzer (also known as Mukin-zeri or Nabu-mukin-zeri) who became a king of Babylon in 732. B.C.E. instead of Nabu-shum-ukin II whom he superseded. Later, Tiglath-pileser III devastated Bit-Amukani for the second time and defeated Mukin-zeri. Shalmaneser III (856-824) inscriptions note that two Chaldean leaders (Mušallim-Marduk of Bīt-Amukāni and Adīnu of Bīt-Dakkūri) carried silver, gold, tin, bronze, elephant tusks, elephant skins, ebony and sissoowood (or meskannu-wood) as a tribute to the King of Assyria.  

Though unconfirmed statement, the economy of Bīt-Amūkāni probably relied on producing dates.

Tiglath-pileser III described his genocide of Bit-Amukani with words: "the land Bit-Amukani I threshed as with a threshing instrument. I took all of its people (and) its property to Assyria." Although Tiglath-pileser III's writings testify about conflict with Bīt-Amūkāni, Bīt-Amūkāni never went extinct but actually remained important through later Babylonian history.

Sennacherib's inscriptions note that Bit-Amukani consisted of 39 walled cities and 350 villages. Its capital was Sapia (Assyrian Sapīya or Šapīya).

List of Bīt-Amūkāni leaders

References 

Chaldea
Ancient peoples of the Near East